Ben Watson or Benjamin Watson may refer to:
Ben Watson (footballer, born July 1985), English footballer with Charlton Athletic
Ben Watson (footballer, born December 1985), English footballer with St Martins
Ben Watson (music writer) (born 1957), British Marxist writer on music
Ben Watson (weightlifter) (born 1990), British weightlifter
Ben Watson (politician) (born 1959), American politician in the Georgia State Senate
Benjamin Watson (born 1980), American football player
Benjamin Charles Watson, Canadian actor
Benjamin Philip Watson (1880-1976), Scottish obstetrician
Ben Watson (cyclist) (born 1989), British para cyclist
Ben Watson (motocross racer) (born 1997), British motocross rider